Berekum United Football Club is a Ghanaian professional football club based in Berekum, Bono Region, previously known as Bechem Chelsea Football Club. They compete in the Ghanaian top-flight league called the First Capital Premier League.

History
The club was formed on 21 July 2004 in the then Brong Ahafo Region of Ghana. In 2008, four years after the inception of the club during that period playing and rising in the lower leagues, it was promoted to the Ghana premier league after winning their zone of the Division One League.

The board of directors heeded the advice by the Ghana Football Association to use the name Berekum Chelsea rather than the Bechem Chelsea. The club was later moved to Bechem and its name changed to Bechem Chelsea in conformity with its home base.

Coffie, the club's Communications Director said that preparations were underway in developing a football park at Bechem to serve as the team's home ground.

The club's name and home kit are inspired by Chelsea. The club played at Ohene Djan Sports Stadium for their first Glo Premier League match on 24 November 2008 and won the match with a 3–2 victory against Liberty Professionals. The club started the 2010–11 Ghanaian Premier League season very strongly and then eventually went on to win the league.

Kit sponsor
The Ghanaian Premier League side, have struck a partnership deal with kit manufacturing firm, Puma AG.

Honours
Ghana Premier League
Champions: 2010–11

Performance in CAF competitions
CAF Champions League: 2 appearances
2012 – Group stage
2014 – First Round

CAF Confederation Cup: 0 appearances
CAF Super Cup: 0 appearances

Current squad

First team
As of 14 October, 2022.

Former players

  Isaac Ayipei
 Nicholas Opoku

Staff

Management
 Chairman:  Obed Nana Nketiah
 Vice Chairman:  Francis Adjei Yeboah 
 Director of Sports:  Ralph Gyambrah
 Communications Director:  Isaac Amponsah
 Chief Executive Officer:  Nana Kwame Nketiah
 Secretary & Assistant CEO:  Tetteh Adu Samuel

Sports
 Head Coach:  Abdul-Hanan
 Assistant Coach:  Randolph Armah
 Head Coach U-20:  Randolph Armah 
 Assistant Coach U-20:  Gyamfi Bright Sowah

Notable players
For all former players with a Wikipedia article see :Category:Berekum Chelsea F.C. players

References

External links
 Official Site

 
Chelsea
Chelsea
2000 establishments in Ghana
Sports clubs in Ghana
Association football clubs established in 2000